Paul Michael Glaser (born Paul Manfred Glaser March 25, 1943) is an American actor and director best known for his role as Detective Dave Starsky on the 1970s television series, Starsky & Hutch. In between his work writing and directing, Glaser also played Captain Jack Steeper on the NBC series Third Watch from 2004 to 2005, appeared as Al in several episodes of Ray Donovan in the 2010s, and had his first U.S. exhibition of his artwork in 2018.

Early life 
Paul Manfred Glaser was born March 25, 1943 in Cambridge, Massachusetts, the youngest child and only son of Dorothy and Samuel Glaser, an MIT graduate and well-known Boston architect. He grew up in Brookline and Newton. He was raised Jewish, and although Dorothy was an agnostic, and the family did not observe the Shabbat, the family did celebrate the religion's major holidays, including Glaser's own bar mitzvah. Samuel designed a shul in Rhode Island. Glaser attended the Buckingham Browne & Nichols School until 1961 before transferring to the Cambridge School of Weston, completing high school.  Glaser attended Tulane University, where he was roommates with film director Bruce Paltrow, majoring in theater and English with a minor in architecture and graduated in 1966. He was a member of the Sigma Alpha Mu fraternity. He earned a master's degree in fine arts from Boston University in acting and directing in 1967.

Career 

Glaser made his film debut as Perchick in the 1971 film version of the musical Fiddler on the Roof. 
He found fame playing Detective Dave Starsky opposite David Soul in the television series Starsky and Hutch, of which he directed several episodes. It ran for four seasons (1975–1979) on ABC.

After the series, Glaser continued to act on television and in films, and directed the 1987 film The Running Man starring Arnold Schwarzenegger as well as the 1992 film The Cutting Edge. He also directed episodes of several TV series, including Miami Vice, Robbery Homicide Division and Judging Amy. Glaser returned to the big screen in 2003 in Something's Gotta Give, as Diane Keaton's ex-husband, and with a brief cameo in the 2004 film version of Starsky & Hutch, in which Starsky was played by Ben Stiller. He directed the children's film Kazaam starring Shaquille O'Neal. He guest starred in "The Scarlet Letter", the October 1, 2009 episode of CBS's The Mentalist.

Between 2013 and 2019, Glaser appeared as Alan in several episodes of the TV series Ray Donovan. In an interview published in April 2018, Glaser, having not acted since that role was asked he had retired from acting, and replied, "People ask me, 'What's your favorite: acting, directing or writing?' My answer: What life occurs. It's what happens. You never know when something will cross your path. I try to stay open to everything. I'm doing a guest appearance on Grace and Frankie right now. As long as it's a good group of people, I'm open to anything. That's the thing I enjoy most about filmmaking or acting: experience." That same month, Glaser had his first American solo exhibition for his paintings and digital illustrations at Cosmo Lofts in Hollywood. The show was titled "Act 111", because his foray as an artist marked the third stage of his career, following acting in front of the camera, and writing/directing behind it.

Personal life 
Glaser has been married twice. He married his first wife, Elizabeth Glaser, in 1980. In August 1981, she contracted HIV through a blood transfusion while giving birth to the couple's first child, Ariel. Elizabeth did not know that she was infected with the virus until four years later, when both she and Ariel became sick with a mysterious illness. When the entire family was tested, Elizabeth, Ariel and the couple's one-and-a-half-year-old son Jake were found to be HIV positive. Ariel died three years later, right after her seventh birthday.  Elizabeth died December 3, 1994.

Glaser later married Tracy Barone, who adopted Jake, who was 10 years old at the time. The couple had a daughter, Zoe. That marriage ended with Glaser filing for divorce in June 2007. As of 2007, Jake remained healthy, and as of 2016, had maintained his relationship with Tracy.

Filmography

Film

Television

References

External links

 
 
 
 Paul Michael Glaser at Internet Off-Broadway Database
 Elizabeth Glaser Pediatric AIDS Foundation
 

1943 births
21st-century American Jews
Male actors from Cambridge, Massachusetts
HIV/AIDS activists
American male film actors
American male soap opera actors
Film directors from Massachusetts
American health activists
American male television actors
American television directors
Boston University College of Fine Arts alumni
Living people
Tulane University alumni
Jewish American male actors
Buckingham Browne & Nichols School alumni